Scotstown is a townland in County Tyrone, Northern Ireland. It is situated in the historic barony of Strabane Lower and the civil parish of Urney and covers an area of 84 acres. 

The population of the townland declined during the 19th century:

See also
List of townlands of County Tyrone

References

Townlands of County Tyrone
Civil parish of Urney